The Qemal Stafa High School is a high school located in Tirana, Albania.

Founded in 1925 by Prime Minister Ahmet Zogu, as the Lyceum of Tirana, it has many notable alumni, of whom 75 died in World War II and 14 were awarded the title of People's Hero of Albania during World War II.

Notable alumni

Recipients of the title Hero of Albania
Qemal Stafa
Vasil Shanto
Ali Demi
Margarita Tutulani
Asim Zeneli

Science personalities
Neritan Ceka

In literature
Jakov Xoxa
Dionis Bubani
Petro Zheji
Teodor Keko
Gjergj Zheji
Fatos Kongoli

In sports
Skënder Begeja
Besim Fagu
Zihni Gjinali
Rexhep Spahiu
Petrit Dibra
Klodeta Gjini
Sulejman Demollari
Igli Tare

Recipients of People's Artist of Albania title
Naim Frashëri (actor)
Sandër Prosi
Pirro Mani
Vaçe Zela
Violeta Manushi
Robert Ndrenika
Janaq Paço

Recipients of Merited Artist of Albania title
Ndriçim Xhepa
Hysen Hakani

Recipients of the Merited Painter of Albania and People's Painter of Albania titles
Andrea Kushi
Abdurrahim Buza
Fatmir Haxhiu
Nexhmedin Zajmi
Maks Velo

References

Secondary schools in Albania
Educational institutions established in 1925
Education in Tirana
Buildings and structures in Tirana
1925 establishments in Albania